Lene Elise Bergum (born November 19, 1971 in Kristiansand, Norway) is a Norwegian actress.

Her breakthrough as an actress came with her role as "Lene" in the movie Hodet over vannet (1993), which has later been remade as a Hollywood-movie, Head Above Water, with Cameron Diaz in the lead role. She had a prominent role as "Camilla" in the TVNorge sit-com Tre på toppen (Three on the Top) in 1997. It was, however, with her role as "Alexandra ‘Alex’ Kvamme" in TV2's success soap Hotel Cæsar that she became a household name for most Norwegians. She acted on the show from 1998 to 2001, and made a comeback in 2004 before she left once more in May of that year. She also had a role in the TV2-show Far og sønn (Father and Son) i 2002. In 2005 she competed for the Norwegian team on the Scandinavian Robinson VIP production.

Bergum also runs a catering company, called Appetitten Kantine og Catering (Appetite Canteen and Catering).

Filmography
 1993 Hodet over vannet, «Lene»
 1998–2000 Hotel Cæsar (TV), Alexandra 'Alex' Kvamme

References

External links
 
 

1971 births
Living people
Norwegian film actresses
People from Kristiansand
Norwegian television actresses